Serhiy Omelyanovych (13 August 1977 – 21 July 2015) was a Ukrainian professional footballer. He last played as a midfielder for FCLL and held Belgian nationality. His last name is sometimes transliterated as Omelianovitch.

Club career
He made his professional debut in the Ukrainian Premier League in the 1993–94 season for Zorya Luhansk.

Omelyanovych's talent caught the eye of Charleroi and he signed for the Belgian club in the summer of 1994. Sergei spent 7 years with the team. In the 2002/03 season he played for Westerlo and next three seasons for Verbroedering Geel. Omelianovitch signed for AC Allianssi in Finland for the 2005 season. In 2006, he returned to Belgium, signing a half-year contract with Tubize. In July 2006 he played for Ethnikos Asteras in Greece, just month after he left the club. He has also played for Ronse, R.F.C. de Liège and Wallonia Walhain. In September 2009 he signed for FCLL.

International career
Omelyanovych played for the Ukraine's youth national under-16 teams and Under-21. In 1994, he appeared at the European Under-16 Championship in Ireland, where Ukraine finished third.

References

External links
 
 Profile at FCLL official site
 
 
 Profile at legioner.kulichki.com

1977 births
2015 deaths
People from Stakhanov, Ukraine
Ukrainian footballers
Ukraine under-21 international footballers
Ukraine youth international footballers
Ukrainian Premier League players
FC Zorya Luhansk players
Ukrainian expatriate footballers
Expatriate footballers in Belgium
Ukrainian expatriate sportspeople in Belgium
Naturalised citizens of Belgium
Belgian people of Ukrainian descent
Belgian footballers
Belgian expatriate footballers
Expatriate footballers in Finland
Expatriate footballers in Greece
Association football midfielders
R. Charleroi S.C. players
RFC Liège players
A.F.C. Tubize players
K.V.C. Westerlo players
Belgian Pro League players
Ethnikos Asteras F.C. players
R. Wallonia Walhain Chaumont-Gistoux players
AC Allianssi players
Veikkausliiga players
RAAL La Louvière players
Sportspeople from Luhansk Oblast